Bakota is a historic submerged settlement of the Rus Kingdom, modern-day Khmelnytskyi Oblast (province) in western Ukraine. The village lies beneath the Dniester River and is located in the historical Podillia region.

Bakota has an ancient Orthodox cave monastery (48.585647°N, 26.999702°E), which includes ancient frescoes and paintings dating back to the 12th-14th centuries, as well as preserved remains of monks. Local legend has it that the Bakota Cave Monastery was founded by Saint Anthony of Kiev, who also founded the historic Kiev Pechersk Lavra in 1051, now in Kyiv, Ukraine. A Paleolithic archaeological site is also located near the village. Bakota is currently part of the National Environmental Park "Podilski Tovtry".

History
Bakota was first mentioned in the Hypatian Chronicle in the year 1240. When the town was first settled, the town was part of the state of Kievan Rus', until the middle of the 12th century when it became a part of the Halych-Volhynian Kingdom. In the 13th century, Bakota served as the political and administrative center of the Dniester Lowland (Ponyzzia), which was at the time part of Halych-Volhynia. The chronicle also mentions the rule of the Koriatovych dynasty over the area in 1362.

After being ruled by the Koriatovych dynasty, the town was controlled by Algirdas, a monarch of the medieval Grand Duchy of Lithuania. The Lithuanian Chronicle of 1362 mentions that a functioning cave monastery exists within the town. This motivated the construction of fortifications, to protect the town from Crimean Tatar raids. In 1431, Bakota was located and shared between the Grand Duchy of Lithuania and the Kingdom of Poland. Bakota's inhabitants later started a revolt and proclaimed their independence, which was crushed by Poland within three years The town's fortifications and castle were also destroyed.

In 1893, in place of a formerly standing church, a new wooden one was constructed, founded by the Episcop of Podillia and Bratslav Dmitry. The church was destroyed in 1960. On October 27, 1981, the village of Bakota was flooded when the New Dniester Hydroelectric Station was built. The village's inhabitants were moved from the area and re-settled not far away. In 1996, large portions of Bakota's rocky hills broke off and buried most of the village's ancient caves.

Notable residents
 Faina Melnik, Olympic champion discus thrower.

References

External links

 
 

Submerged settlements in Ukraine
History of Khmelnytskyi Oblast
Populated places established in the 11th century
11th-century establishments in Ukraine
Podolia Voivodeship
Ushitsky Uyezd
1981 disestablishments in Ukraine
Populated places disestablished in 1981